"Love's Gonna Fall Here Tonight" is a song written by Kendal Franceschi, and recorded by American country music artist Razzy Bailey.  It was released in August 1982 as the first single from the album A Little More Razz.  The song reached number 8 on the Billboard Hot Country Singles & Tracks chart.

Chart performance

References

1982 singles
Razzy Bailey songs
Song recordings produced by Bob Montgomery (songwriter)
RCA Records singles
1982 songs
Songs written by Kendal Franceschi